Mark Patrick Storen (born c. 1959), better known by his professional name Mark Patrick,  is an American radio personality based in Indianapolis. Starting out on satellite radio, he was part of MLB Network Radio as the co-host of Baseball This Morning along with Buck Martinez and Larry Bowa . Patrick also hosted the Hoosier Lottery television game show Hoosier Millionaire for 14 years. Patrick also had a nationally syndicated morning show on Fox Sports Radio for a few years.  Patrick was primary sports anchor for WISH-TV from 1990 to 1998.

Patrick also provided a number of voice characterizations on The Bob and Tom Show for many years beginning in the late '80s. His characters included a fictional traffic reporter named "T.C." and impressions of Howard Cosell, Harry Caray, and Marge Schott. The Harry Caray character had a recurring skit called "After Hours Sports with Harry Caray" where "Harry" would interview various celebrities. After the real Harry Caray died in 1998, the skit was renamed "After Life Sports with Harry Caray" so that Patrick could continue his comic impression as the ghost of Harry Caray.

Patrick graduated from Brownsburg High School in 1977, and then attended Ball State University. Patrick married Pam Nelson and they have two children; son Drew Storen is a former Major League Baseball pitcher.

Notes

1950s births
Television anchors from Indianapolis
Living people